James Turle (5 March 1802 – 28 June 1882) was an English organist and composer, best known today as the writer of several widely sung Anglican chants and the hymn tune "Westminster" sung to the words of Frederick William Faber "My God, how wonderful thou art".

Turle was born at Taunton, Somerset, and started as a choirboy at Wells Cathedral. In 1817 he became a pupil of G. E. Williams, organist  at Westminster Abbey in London, and after acting as deputy for some years he succeeded to this post himself in 1831 and held it until his death. He and Sir John Goss, the organist at St Paul's Cathedral, had been fellow pupils in London as boys. Turle was a great organist in his day, and composed a good deal of church music which was well known. His son Henry Frederic Turle (1835–1883) was a journalist.

Notes

External links
 

1802 births
1882 deaths
English composers
English classical organists
British male organists
People from Taunton
Master of the Choristers at Westminster Abbey
19th-century British composers
19th-century English musicians
19th-century British male musicians
Male classical organists
19th-century organists